Acrolepia cestrella is a moth of the family Acrolepiidae. It was described by August Busck in 1934. It is found on Cuba.

References

Moths described in 1934
Acrolepiidae